Seliște is a commune in Orhei District, Moldova. It is composed of three villages: Lucășeuca, Mana, and Seliște.

Notable people 
 Paul Goma (1935–2020), Romanian writer and dissident.

References

Communes of Orhei District